The Catawba Nuclear Station is a nuclear power plant located on a  peninsula, called "Concord Peninsula", that reaches out into Lake Wylie, in York, South Carolina, USA. Catawba utilizes a pair of Westinghouse four-loop pressurized water reactors.

As a part of the Megatons to Megawatts Program Catawba was one of the plants that received and tested 4 fuel assemblies containing MOX fuel with the plutonium supplied from old weapons programs. Because concerns of nuclear proliferation are greater with fuel containing plutonium, special precautions and added security were used around the new fuel. The four test assemblies did not perform as expected and at present those plans are shelved.

History 
In 2005, Catawba Nuclear Station's Unit 1 was selected to test four fuel assemblies containing mixed oxide (MOX) fuel, incorporating 140 kg of plutonium supplied from recycled nuclear weapons material. The MOX fuel pellets were supplied by the Cadarache reprocessing facilitiy, and placed into fuel assemblies at the Melox facility, both in France. This test was part of the "Megatons to Megawatts" program, which was part of the Plutonium Management and Disposition Agreement between the United States and Russia.

Plant design 
The Catawba Nuclear Station uses ice condensers as part of its emergency containment systems. A nuclear plant ice condenser is a passive, static heat sink that relies on large quantities of ice to mitigate severe accidents. Ice condensers are designed to limit pressure in the event of an accidental steam release. This design allows smaller containment structures and reduced material requirements.

Ownership 
Unit 1:
 Operator: Duke Power
 Owners: Duke Energy Carolinas, LLC 19.25%; North Carolina Municipal Power Agency 37.50%; North Carolina Electric Member Corporation 30.75%
 Unit 2:
 Operator: Duke Power
 Owners: As above, 12.5% Piedmont Municipal Power Agency (PMPA). (According to PMPA, it held 25% of Unit 2.)

Electricity Production

Surrounding population

The 2010 population within  of Catawba was 213,407, an increase of 53.3 percent in a decade, according to an analysis of the 2010 United States Census. The 2010 population within  was 2,559,394, an increase of 25.0 percent since 2000. Cities within 50 miles include Charlotte, North Carolina (35 miles to city center).

Seismic risk
In 2010, the NRC estimated the risk each year of an earthquake intense enough to cause core damage to the reactor at Catawba was 1 in 27,027.

Incidents

15 May 2013
More than 100 gallons of water contaminated with radioactive tritium was released. However, the levels of tritium were less than one half the EPA limit for tritium and the leak was contained before it reached ground water.

18 July 2017
After a 1-month standard inspection, the Nuclear Regulatory Commission (NRC) found that Catawba Nuclear Station staff had failed to take preventive maintenance measures after an electrical component in one of the emergency diesel generators had failed a routine inspection test. As a result, the NRC increased oversight of the plant until the issue was corrected. This incident was concluded to be of low to moderate safety significance.

See also

 Duke Energy
 Largest nuclear power plants in the United States

References

External links

Energy infrastructure completed in 1985
Energy infrastructure completed in 1986
Buildings and structures in York County, South Carolina
Nuclear power plants in South Carolina
Nuclear power stations using pressurized water reactors
Duke Energy
1985 establishments in South Carolina